A thermodynamic solar panel is a type of air source heat pump. Instead of a large fan to take energy from the air, it has a flat plate collector. This means the system gains energy from the sun as well as the ambient air. Thermodynamic water heaters use a compressor to transfer the collected heat from the panel to the hot water system using refrigerant fluid that circulates in a closed cycle.

Renewable Heat Incentive
In the UK, thermodynamic solar panels cannot be used to claim the Renewable Heat Incentive. This is due to the lack of technical standards for the testing and installation. The UK Microgeneration Certification Scheme is working to develop a testing standard, either based on MIS 3001 or MIS 3005 or a brand new scheme document if appropriate.

Performance

Lab testing has been carried out by Das Wärmepumpen-Testzentrum Buchs (WPZ) in Buchs Switzerland on an Energi Eco 200esm/i thermodynamic solar panel system. This showed a Coefficient of performance of 2.8 or 2.9 (depending on tank volume).

In the UK, the first independent test is under-way at Narec Distributed Energy. So far data is available for January to April 2014. As with the Carnot cycle, the achievable efficiency is strongly dependent on the temperatures on both side of the system.

References

External links
Narec Distributed Energy thermodynamic solar panel test data

Sustainable technologies
Heat pumps
Heating
Energy conservation
Building engineering